Dean Matthews (born 21 July 1971) is a former Australian rules footballer who played for St Kilda in the Australian Football League (AFL) in 1995. He was recruited from the Bulleen-Templestowe Football Club in the Victorian Amateur Football Association (VAFA) with the 43rd selection in the 1994 AFL Draft. After playing with St Kilda, Dean returned to BTAFC to play more than 300 senior games for his club. Dean played in 2 senior premierships with the Bullants (2004 and 2008), captained the club for 7 years. Dean was also Captain/ Coach for 1 season in 2001. 
Whilst playing in the VAFA, Dean played 12 states games and was Captain of the Big V on 4 occasions.

Dean holds the club record for senior games, being ahead of Dean Tulloch and Paul Robertson.

References

External links

Living people
1971 births
St Kilda Football Club players
Australian rules footballers from Victoria (Australia)